Walcott Peak is a large nunatak midway between Mount Jukkola and Lokey Peak in the south part of the Guthridge Nunataks, in central Palmer Land. Mapped by the United States Geological Survey (USGS) in 1974. Named by Advisory Committee on Antarctic Names (US-ACAN) for Lieutenant Fred P. Walcott, CEC, U.S. Navy, Officer-in-Charge of the South Pole Station in 1973.

Mountains of Palmer Land